Phrynobatrachus dispar is a species of frog in the family Phrynobatrachidae. It is known as Peters' river frog and the Príncipe puddle frog. It is endemic to São Tomé and Príncipe. Its natural habitat is puddles in primary forest, farm bush (heavily degraded former forest), and abandoned plantations. It was first described as Arthroleptis dispar by Wilhelm Peters in 1870. The species is found on the island of Príncipe in areas up to 947 meters above sea level.

See also
Phrynobatrachus leveleve

References

dispar
Endemic vertebrates of São Tomé and Príncipe
Endemic fauna of Príncipe
Amphibians described in 1870
Taxa named by Wilhelm Peters
Taxonomy articles created by Polbot